The 2008–09 Plus Pujol Lleida season is their 6th season in the Adecco LEB Oro.

Game log

September 
Record: 2–0; Home: 1–0; Road: 1–0

October 
Record: 2–3; Home: 1–2; Road: 1–1

November 
Record: 2–2; Home: 1–1; Road: 1–1

December 
Record: 2–1; Home: 0–1; Road: 2–0

January 
Record: 1–3; Home: 0–1; Road: 1–2

February 
Record: 2–2; Home: 2–0; Road: 0–2

March 
Record: 1–3; Home: 0–2; Road: 1–1

April 
Record: 4–1; Home: 3–0; Road: 1–1

May 
Record: 2–1; Home: 2–0; Road: 0–1

Player stats

Regular season and play off

Lleida Basquet season